Nemanja Zlatković (Serbian Cyrillic: Немања Златковић; born 21 August 1988) is a Serbian professional footballer who plays as a left-back.

Career
In August of 2020, Zlatković joined FK Dinamo Pančevo. After a spell at FK Sloga Kraljevo, Zlatković moved to OFK Beograd in the summer 2021.

References

External links
Nemanja Zlatković at Sofascore

Living people
1988 births
Footballers from Belgrade
Serbian footballers
Serbian expatriate footballers
Expatriate footballers in Slovakia
Serbian expatriate sportspeople in Slovakia
Expatriate footballers in Greece
Serbian expatriate sportspeople in Greece
Expatriate footballers in the Czech Republic
Serbian expatriate sportspeople in the Czech Republic
Expatriate footballers in Bosnia and Herzegovina
Serbian expatriate sportspeople in Bosnia and Herzegovina
Expatriate footballers in Sweden
Serbian expatriate sportspeople in Sweden
Serbian First League players
Slovak Super Liga players
Football League (Greece) players
Czech National Football League players
Premier League of Bosnia and Herzegovina players
Serbian SuperLiga players
Ettan Fotboll players
FK Zemun players
MŠK Žilina players
Diagoras F.C. players
FC Fastav Zlín players
FK Sarajevo players
Panachaiki F.C. players
FK Javor Ivanjica players
FK Voždovac players
FK Novi Pazar players
FK Radnik Bijeljina players
Ängelholms FF players
FK Tuzla City players
NK Čelik Zenica players
FK Dinamo Pančevo players
FK Sloga Kraljevo players
OFK Beograd players
Serbia youth international footballers
Association football defenders